Ozone Wireless, or Ozone, was a Barbadian mobile network operator and telecommunications company founded in 2011.  Ozone was one of three major mobile operators in the country.

Network

Network information 
The IMSI - Network Code of Ozone is 342-800 and the MSISDN Network Codes are: 695 (international: +1 246 695), 696 (international: +1 246 696) and 697 (international: +1 246 697).

Through colocation agreements, and organic growth the company started with an LTE network to provide service across the island of Barbados. The company has deployed a 4G LTE network, providing peak data rates of up to 50 Mbit/s.

Services 
Ozone, offers its customers: post and pre-paid subscription packages, SMS / MMS, international wifi only roaming, voicemail, mobile hotspots.

Smartphones 
As of 2018 Ozone Wireless offers the following smartphones for use on its network.
 Apple iPhone (several models)
 Huawei Y5 II
 Samsung J7 NEO
 Samsung S7 Edge
 Samsung S8

See also 

 List of planned LTE networks
 List of mobile network operators of the Americas

References

External links 
 Official site

Barbadian brands
Telecommunications companies established in 2011
Internet service providers of Barbados
Mobile phone companies of the Caribbean
Telecommunications companies of Barbados